The 1922 Rhode Island Rams football team was an American football team that represented Rhode Island State College (later renamed the University of Rhode Island) as an independent during the 1922 college football season. In its third season under head coach Frank Keaney, the team compiled a 4–4 record.

Schedule

References

Rhode Island State
Rhode Island Rams football seasons
Rhode Island State Rams football